Natasha Jane Barker (born 30 November 1970 in Sydney) is an Australian weightlifter, competing in the 53 kg category and representing Australia at international competitions.

She participated at the 2000 Summer Olympics in the 58 kg event. She competed at world championships, most recently at the 2002 World Weightlifting Championships.

She was silver medallist in the 53kg category at the 2002 Commonwealth Games in Manchester, UK; and won a bronze medal in the 58kg division at the 2006 Commonwealth Games in Melbourne, Australia.

Major results

References

External links
http://www.triumphweightlifting.com/index.php/about/coaches
http://corporate.olympics.com.au/athlete/natasha-barker
Natasha Barker at Sports Reference
http://www.smh.com.au/news/weight-lifting/barker-bites-bullet/2006/03/18/1142582580823.html
http://www.smh.com.au/news/weight-lifting/aussie-bronze-in-weightlifting/2006/03/18/1142582566388.html
https://www.youtube.com/watch?v=gPt0N4hOhq0

1970 births
Living people
Australian female weightlifters
Weightlifters at the 2000 Summer Olympics
Olympic weightlifters of Australia
Sportspeople from Sydney
Weightlifters at the 2006 Commonwealth Games
Commonwealth Games silver medallists for Australia
Commonwealth Games bronze medallists for Australia
Commonwealth Games medallists in weightlifting
Sportswomen from New South Wales
20th-century Australian women
21st-century Australian women
Medallists at the 2006 Commonwealth Games